Geranium platypetalum, commonly called glandular crane's-bill or broad-petaled geranium, is a herbaceous plant species in the family Geraniaceae. It is native to Iran, Turkey, Armenia, Azerbaijan, Georgia, and the Russian Federation, and is cultivated as a garden subject, under a number of different cultivar names. It has blue-colored flowers.

References

platypetalum